The Kentucky Derby Festival is an annual festival held in Louisville, Kentucky, during the two weeks preceding the first Saturday in May, the day of the Kentucky Derby. The festival, Kentucky's largest single annual event, first ran from 1935 to 1937, and restarted in 1956 and includes:
 Thunder Over Louisville, the largest annual fireworks display in North America;
 the Great Balloon Race;
 The Great Steamboat Race, featuring the Belle of Louisville;
 the Pegasus Parade, one of the largest parades in the United States; and
 the Kentucky Derby Festival Marathon & miniMarathon.
 the Kentucky Derby Festival Basketball Classic

History
The Kentucky Derby Festival Association started the first week-long festival in 1935, including a parade, a riverfront regatta and an orchestral concert.  The first director was Olympic gold medalist Arnold Jackson. In 1937, a Derby Festival king and queen were crowned, marking the start of this tradition.  After the floods of 1937, the festival was discontinued and it was not until 1956 when the modern-day Kentucky Derby Festival was reborn. In 2020, the festival was cancelled due to COVID-19, the first such cancellation since 1938.

In 1962 Tom "Cactus" Brooks received the first Kentucky Derby Festival Silver Horseshoe Award, "given to a person who had made a difference in the community and in youth development".

Official events

Events vary from year to year but always include numerous athletic events, including the miniMarathon and Marathon; concerts; fashion shows; wine tastings; luncheons and private parties ranging from backyard barbecues to lavish Derby Eve balls attended by entertainment stars, famed athletes and other persons of note.

The Royal Court
The Royal Court is among the oldest traditions of the Kentucky Derby Festival tradition, dating back to the 1950s by The Fillies, Inc. The Royal Court consists of a group of five young women chosen to preside over events related to the Kentucky Derby. These women officially represent both the Derby Festival and the city of Louisville. In January, a court of Derby Princesses is selected from a pool of more than 1000 applicants. Thirty finalists are selected and the pool is then reduced to five young women who make up the court. Criteria for the selection of the court members includes knowledge of the Derby Festival, poise, intelligence, personality, academic excellence and campus/community involvement.

The court attends nearly 70 events during the two-week period leading up to the Kentucky Derby. The queen is selected by a spin of the wheel at the Annual Fillies Derby Ball. The festival saw this method of queen selections as the most fair way to select from their court and the tradition continues today. Each member of the court is awarded a $2000 scholarship, an entire wardrobe for the festival, VIP access to all events and a chauffeur for the entire two weeks of the official Kentucky Derby Festival.

Thunder Over Louisville

The festival's first major event is Thunder Over Louisville. Thunder kicks off with a day-long air show ranked as fifth-largest in the United States and the largest fireworks display in North America. The approximately 30 minute firework display begins at nightfall. Thunder Over Louisville's fireworks have been designed and performed by Zambelli Fireworks International since 1991.

Fest-A-Ville 
During the festival, much of Waterfront Park is billed as "Fest-A-Ville". It hosts a number of events, including the Chow Wagon, rides, and concerts.

Poster 
Each year, an official Derby Festival poster is unveiled and prints are sold to help finance festival events. Artists and photographers who have produced the prized posters include Peter Max and Michael Schwab.

Pegasus Parade 
The first event held by KDF was the 1956 Pegasus Parade. The parade is held annually on the Thursday before Derby.

NBC Today Show weatherman Willard Scott was the host of WAVE TV's broadcast coverage of the Pegasus Parade from 1982 through 2005.

Sports 
Various sport competitions are held as part of the Festival. From 1973 to 2017, the Festival hosted the Kentucky Derby Festival Basketball Classic. Since 1974, a pro-am golf tournament has been held.

Races 
A number of races take place in the festival. The Kentucky Derby Festival miniMarathon and Marathon occur the Saturday before the Kentucky Derby; USA Track and Field named the miniMarathon among the nation's top 50 races. The mini has been held since 1974. That same Saturday is typically also when the Great Balloon Race is held, the culmination of the hot air balloon-themed BalloonFest.

Recognition is given to Louisville's restaurant employees with the Run for the Rosé, where waiters and waitresses run an obstacle course while carrying trays of glasses filled with White Zinfandel Wine.  Servers finishing with the best time and most wine remaining in the glasses win prizes.

For the annual bed races, businesses create themed mobile beds that are paraded before being race on an indoor track with costumed employees. The Great Steamboat Race usually takes place in the week before Derby, where the Belle of Louisville typically takes on at least one challenger.

Miscellenous 
Since 1997, a spelling bee has been held for the festival.

Pegasus pins 
Since 1973, KDF has sold a plastic pin for the Kentucky Derby featuring a pegasus. The pin is used as proof of purchase for admission to a number of the KDF events.

Derby cruising
A controversial aspect of the Derby Festival is "Derby Cruising." Though it is not an official or licensed event during Derby Festival, it takes place in the historically black areas of West Broadway on Derby day and the Friday before it. Cruising consists of motorcycles and cars (many elaborately modified) driving slowly down Broadway, pedestrians crowding the sidewalks, and several blocks closed for a festival with rides and street vendors. The gridlock associated with cruising made it difficult for police to respond to instances of violence during 2005 Derby cruising. In 2006, police made an effort to stop cruising, shutting down Broadway except to emergency vehicles, which resulted in suggestions of racial profiling and much public debate about the legitimacy of Broadway cruising as a free alternative to other festivities.

In 2007, police announced similar plans, although slightly more of Broadway was to remain open, including access to Shawnee Park. The 2007 plan sparked a lawsuit by business owners and a civil rights foundation, claiming the shutdown of Broadway during Derby week violated their constitutional rights and cost them hundreds of thousands of dollars in business. A federal judge allowed the plans to proceed, citing concerns about "public safety and the free flow of traffic".

In 2008, police again banned cruising, but with a new plan allowing traffic to flow but to have a high number of officers on hand to enforce the city's noise and cruising ordinances, the latter of which prevents vehicles from blocking a roadway. Police reported that arrests were down from 2007, although they did shut down a 10-block portion of Broadway for a short time on Derby evening after gridlock developed.

See also
 Hillbilly Outfield: Kentucky Derby party
 List of attractions and events in the Louisville metropolitan area

References

External links
 Kentucky Derby Festival website
 Kentucky Derby website
 Thunder Over Louisville website

Festivals established in 1956
Horse racing meetings
Kentucky Derby
Festivals in Louisville, Kentucky
Marathons in the United States
Hot air balloon festivals
Parades in the United States
1956 establishments in Kentucky
April events
May events